Friends ...'Til the End: The One with All Ten Years is the official companion book to Friends, one of the world's most successful sitcoms. It includes exclusive interviews with the six main cast members, the complete story of all ten seasons and a special section on the series finale. It was written by American author David Wild and was published in May 2004 by Headline Book Publishing.

2004 non-fiction books
Books about television
Friends (1994 TV series)
Headline Publishing Group books